Lakaram lake is a lake in the city of Khammam. It has been developed recently under the auspices of Khammam MLA Sri Puvvada Ajay Kumar by the State government of Telangana under Mission Kakatiya.

Until 15 years ago it was surrounded by trees, but today has an adjoined park named Lakaram Lake View. The lake is popular for boating.

Drinking Water
The lake serves as a drinking water source for the Khanapuram Haveli Suburb of Khammam.

References

Khammam
Tourist attractions in Khammam district